Conner Reeves  (born 8 April 1972) is an English singer and songwriter. He is best known for his 1997 album Earthbound which was released on Colin Lester's and Ian McAndrew's Wildstar label.

Reeves scored five Top 40 singles in the UK Singles Chart, was nominated for a Brit Award for British Breakthrough Act in the 1998 Brit Awards. He performed as support act for many singers, including Whitney Houston on her European tour in 1998.  After breaking with Wildstar Records, Reeves focused on writing songs for other artists like Artful Dodger, Joss Stone, Debbie McGee, Sami Yusuf, Joe Cocker and Tina Turner amongst many others..He gave his song "As Love Is My Witness" to the Irish pop band Westlife for their album Where We Are.

In November 2005, he released the critically acclaimed EP Welcome to the Future through Still Waters Recordings.

On 17 March 2007, a song he wrote titled "I Can", performed by former East 17 singer Brian Harvey, participated in the United Kingdom's national selection for the Eurovision Song Contest. He co-wrote the tracks "Mouth to Mouth" and "Porcelain" with X Factor winner Matt Cardle on his 2013 album Porcelain, as well as being credited with backing vocals and keyboards. After spending a couple of years writing and performing in South West France, he returned to London in 2016 where he now continues to write for various UK and International projects as well as working towards releasing new material as an artist in his own right.

In an interview with Headliner Magazine in 2019 (which noted that he "has a soulful singing voice that inexplicably makes listeners want to cry with happiness"), he revealed why he had stepped out of the limelight for 22 years, and his intention to release new music: "There won’t be any: ‘I love you baby, you drive me crazy,’ or ‘up in the club’. I think that’s been done enough! I like the songs I can really put my heart and soul into. That’s what makes it soul. It’s those kind of songs when I can stand up and say: ‘I mean every word of this,’ so hopefully people will get that. It just feels like I’m on the right path again after that massive detour. A 20 year break! I don’t know where it’s going to lead, I really don’t. But I’m on it, and I’m not getting off it again.”

Discography

Albums
 November 24, 1997: Earthbound – UK No. 25

Singles
 18 August 1997: "My Father's Son" – UK No. 12
 10 November 1997: "Earthbound" – UK No. 14
 30 March 1998: "Read My Mind" – UK No. 19 written with Wayne Cohen
 21 September 1998: "Searching for a Soul" – UK No. 28
 23 August 1999: "Best Friend" (with Mark Morrison) – UK No. 23
 28 November 2005: "Welcome to the Future" (3-track EP)
 20 August 2007: "Joy"
 23 August 2019: "Love Lead Me On"
 30 August 2019: "My Father's Son (Live at the Bedford)"

As composer
With Joss Stone
 Mind Body & Soul (2004)
 Colour Me Free! (2009)

References

External links
 Official site

1972 births
Living people
English male singer-songwriters
English soul singers
21st-century English singers
21st-century British male singers